The eighth season of the Dutch reality singing competition The Voice of Holland premiered on 20 October 2017 on RTL4. Hosts Martijn Krabbé, Wendy van Dijk, and Jamai Loman all returned, as did Sanne Hans, Waylon, and Ali B as coaches, while season 7 coach Guus Meeuwis was replaced with Anouk, who served as a coach on season 6.

New this season was that in the Redroom-app the contestant with the highest percentage of turns could release its blind audition song on iTunes.

Jim van der Zee won the competition from team Anouk and Anouk became the winning mentor for the first time and Jim became the second male to win the show.

Teams
Color key

Blind auditions

Color key

Episode 1 (October 20)
The winners of seasons 5, 6, and 7, O'G3NE, Maan de Steenwinkel, and Pleun Bierbooms respectively, performed "Don't You Worry 'bout a Thing" at the start of the show.

Episode 2 (October 27)

Episode 3 (November 3)

Episode 4 (November 10)

Episode 5 (November 17)

Episode 6 (November 24)

Episode 7 (December 1)

The Battle Rounds

The Battle Rounds determine which artists from each team will advance to the Knockout Rounds. Two (or a group of three artists) from the same will sing in a vocal battle against one other. The Steal Room was continued from Season 7. While steals have returned, each artist that is stolen this season will sit in a designated seat in the Steal Room as they watch the other performances. If a coach has stolen one artist but later decides to steal another, the first artist will be replaced and eliminated by the newly-stolen artist. Contestants who win their battle or are stolen by another coach will advance to the Knockout rounds.

Color key:

The Knockouts

Color key
 – Contestant was eliminated, either immediately (indicated by a "—" in the "Switched with" column) or switched with another contestant
 – Contestant was not switched out and advanced to the Live Shows

The Live Shows

Color key
 – Artist had one of the six lowest scores and was eliminated
 – Artist's score was among the top six, advancing them to the next Live round
 – Artist was voted through by the public vote after having one of the lowest scores

Week 1: Top 12 (January 26)

Week 2: Top 9 (February 2)

Week 3: Semi-Final - Top 6 (February 9)

Just like previous seasons, this week, after all six artists have performed their first songs, one was eliminated based on the ongoing public vote. A second artist was then be eliminated after the top 5's second performances regardless of their teams, leaving four artists advanced to the finale. With the elimination of Kimberly, Waylon had no more act left on his team to compete. With Jim and Nienke still on the competition, Anouk is the first female coach to advance two of her artists into the final. Also, Samantha Steenwijk was the first stolen artist to have ever made it to the finals in the show's history.

Week 4: Final (February 16)

Notes

  Backstage performance

Elimination Chart

Overall
Color key
Artist's info

Result details

Team
Color key
Artist's info

Result details

Artists' appearances in other media
Nikita Pellencau turned three chairs in season 6, opting to be part of Sanne Hans' team. She won her battle against fellow Team Sanne member Chris Link, but was eliminated in the Knockouts. 
Aïcha Gill participated with the girlband Sway X Factor 2011 
Aïrto participated with the Best Singer Songwriter 2015.
Lara Mallo also participated with season 2 and sat in Team Angela. She was in the battle against Rodney Elzer and then lost against him
Gin Dutch participated X Factor 2013
Katharina Wildenbeest participated Holland's Got Talent 2017.
Samantha Steenwijk participated with Bloed, zweet en tranen 2013.
Kira Dekker participated with the Best Singer Songwriter 2014.
Julia van Bergen came 8th in the Junior Eurovision Song Contest 2014 representing the Netherlands..
Gideon Luciana first auditioned in season 6, but did not turn any chairs. 
Demi van Wijngaarden participated in the third season of the Netherlands version of The Voice Kids as part of Team Marco Borsato and made it to the finals, eventually losing to fellow Team Borsato member Ayoub Maach. 
Silke van de Klundert participated in the fourth season of The Voice Kids as a member of Team Borsato, but did not make it past the Battles.
Simon van Rooij participated in the fourth season of The Voice Kids as a member of Team Borsato, but did not make it past the Battles. 
Tjindjara participated in the annual preselection for the Junior Eurovision Song Contest, Junior Songfestival, in 2005. She made it to the finale, but lost to Tess Gaerthé, Tjindjara participated in X Factor in 2013. .
Jennifer Terwel competed on the second season of the Dutch version of the reality singing competition X Factor in 2009, making it to the finals and placing 11th.
Jaclyn Bradley Palmer was a regular cast member on Vh1's Breaking Bonaduce and was also featured on MTV's Date my Mom and HGTV's House Hunters International.
Roemillo Baumgard, with his family, is a part of the series "A House full of Baumgard."
Karlyn (Karlijn Verhagen) participated in X Factor in 2013.
Milan Velberg appeared on Holland's Got Talent and The Next Boy / Girl Band.
Toon Mentink participated in The Next Girl / Boyband where is group: "boyband 4U" won the competition.

Ratings

References

The Voice of Holland
2017 Dutch television seasons
2017 in music